Gregory Stanley Kihn (born July 10, 1949) is an American rock musician, radio personality, and novelist. He founded and led The Greg Kihn Band, which scored hit songs in the 1980s, and has written several horror novels.

History
Kihn was born in Baltimore, Maryland, United States, to parents Stanley J. Kihn, a city Health Department inspector who fought in the Battle of the Bulge during World War II, and Jane (Gregorek) Kihn.

His early influence was The Beatles and their appearance on The Ed Sullivan Show. "Just about every rock and roll musician my age can point to one cultural event that inspired him to take up music in the first place: The Beatles on Ed Sullivan. If you were a shy 14-year-old kid who already had a guitar, it was a life-altering event. ... In a single weekend everything had changed. I'd come home from school the previous Friday looking like Dion. I went back to class on Monday morning with my hair dry and brushed forward. That's how quickly it happened."

Kihn began his career in his hometown of Baltimore, working in the singer/songwriter mold but switched to straightforward rock & roll when he moved to San Francisco, California, in 1974. He started writing songs and playing coffee houses while still in high school in the Baltimore area.  When Kihn was 17, his mother submitted a tape of one of his original songs to the talent contest of the big local Top 40 radio station WCAO, in which he took first prize and won three things that would change his life: a typewriter, a stack of records, and a Vox electric guitar.

Following his move to California, Kihn worked at painting houses, singing in the streets, and working behind the counter at the Berkeley record store, Rather Ripped Records, with future bandmate and Earth Quake guitarist Gary Phillips. The following year, he became one of the first artists signed to Matthew King Kaufman's Beserkley Records. Along with Jonathan Richman, Earth Quake, and The Rubinoos, Kihn helped to carve the label's sound—melodic pop with a strong 1960s pop sensibility — an alternative to the prog rock of the time.

In 1976, after his debut on the compilation Beserkley Chartbusters, he recorded his first album with his own ensemble, called The Greg Kihn Band, comprising Robbie Dunbar (guitar), Steve Wright (bass), and Larry Lynch (drums). Dunbar, already a member of Earth Quake, was replaced by Dave Carpender in time to record their second album, Greg Kihn Again.  Meanwhile, Kihn's old record store pal, Gary Phillips, who had contributed guitars to Kihn's first album, returned as a session musician on the band's Glass House Rock (1980) album and officially joined the band as keyboardist for the follow-up album, Rockihnroll (1981).  The lineup of Kihn, Wright, Lynch, Phillips, and Carpender lasted until 1983, when Greg Douglass replaced Dave Carpender.

Through the 1970s, Kihn released an album each year and built a strong cult following through constant touring, becoming Beserkley's biggest seller.  In 1981, Kihn earned his first bona-fide hit on The Billboard Hot 100 with the # 15 single, "The Breakup Song (They Don't Write 'Em)," from the Rockihnroll album. Kihn continued in a more commercial vein through the 1980s with a series of pun-titled albums: Kihntinued (1982), Kihnspiracy (1983), Kihntageous (1984), and Citizen Kihn (1985).

Kihn scored his biggest hit with "Jeopardy" (1983), which reached number 2 in the Billboard Hot 100, from the Kihnspiracy album. In 1983, the groundbreaking "Jeopardy" video became an MTV favorite.  Many of the videos that followed were sequels with connecting story lines.  One of the earliest examples of a "concept" video with its Night of the Living Dead theme, "Jeopardy" received heavy airplay on the fledgling cable music channel and spawned countless imitators.  "Jeopardy" was spoofed by "Weird Al" Yankovic as "I Lost on Jeopardy", on Yankovic's album "Weird Al" Yankovic in 3-D (1984); Kihn authorized Yankovic to make the spoof under the condition he could participate; which was seen at the end of Yankovic's music video where Yankovic is tossed into a convertible, revealing Kihn to be the driver.

Kihn spent most of the 1980s touring constantly, opening arena-sized shows for groups such as Journey, the Grateful Dead, and the Rolling Stones.  Kihn often appeared on TV during this period on shows such as Solid Gold, American Bandstand, and Saturday Night Live. On May 10, 1981, Kihn and Willie Nile appeared live on the King Biscuit Flower Hour from the Savoy Theater, New York City.

In 1985, Kihn broke with Beserkley Records and signed with EMI.  Matthew Kaufman continued to produce Kihn's albums.  "Lucky" (1985) reached a modest # 30 on the Hot 100 and spawned a splashy video sequel to the popular "Jeopardy" video.

In 1986, Joe Satriani replaced Greg Douglass on lead guitar, Tyler Eng replaced Larry Lynch on drums, and Pat Mosca replaced Gary Phillips on keyboards.  This is the lineup that went into the studio to record the album Love and Rock & Roll (1986).

From 1996 through 2012, Kihn was a morning radio disc jockey for San Francisco Bay Area classic rock radio station KUFX. Kihn's literary career also began in 1996 with the release of his first novel, Horror Show, published by Tor/Forge Books. Horror Show was nominated for the prestigious Bram Stoker Award for Best First Novel.  It was followed by Shade of Pale (1997), Big Rock Beat (1998), and Mojo Hand (1999). Kihn also published many short stories during this period, some appearing in the Hot Blood series of erotic horror fiction.  Kihn was contributing editor to Carved in Rock, a compilation of short fiction by musicians including Pete Townshend, Joan Jett, Ray Davies, and Kinky Friedman.

The Greg Kihn Band continues to play with a line-up comprising Kihn's son Ry Kihn on lead guitar, Dave Danza (from Eddie Money) on drums, Dave Medd (from the Tubes) on keyboards, and Robert Berry (from Hush) on bass.

Kihn was inducted into San Jose Rocks Hall of Fame in 2007.

In September 2013, Kihn conducted an interview with Music Life Radio detailing his life, including music, radio, and writing careers.

Charity work and volunteerism
Kihn has done charity work for “Operation Care and Comfort”, a military support group responsible for sending care packages to hundreds of military units deployed in harm’s way around the world.  He was nominated for the 2010 “Man of the Year Award” by the Lymphoma Society and does work for Children’s Hospital in Oakland, California, in the never ending fight against cancer.

Personal life
Kihn has two children: son Ry, a guitarist; and Lexi, a nurse.

Discography

Author
Kihn has written four horror fiction novels, beginning with Horror Show (1996), which nominated for the Bram Stoker Award for Best First Novel, followed by Shade of Pale (1997). Big Rock Beat and Mojo Hand were subsequently released as sequels to Horror Show.

Kihn also released Carved in Rock: Short Stories by Musicians, a collection of short stories written by him and other well-known rock musicians including Pete Townshend, Graham Parker, Joan Jett, and Ray Davies.

In 2013, Kihn released Rubber Soul, a murder mystery novel featuring the Beatles.

Bibliography

See also
List of Billboard number-one dance club songs
List of artists who reached number one on the U.S. Dance Club Songs chart

References

External links
Greg Kihn's website
[ Greg Kihn's biography on AllMusic.com]

1949 births
American male singers
Writers from San Jose, California
American dance musicians
Musicians from Baltimore
Living people
Musicians from San Jose, California
Radio personalities from California
20th-century American novelists
21st-century American novelists
American male novelists
Singers from California
Singers from Maryland
American rock guitarists
Guitarists from California
Guitarists from Maryland
American male guitarists
20th-century American male writers
21st-century American male writers
The Greg Kihn Band members
20th-century American guitarists
20th-century American male musicians
Playboy Records artists